Milton Palacios may refer to:

Milton Palacios (footballer, born 1980), Honduran retired football centre-back
Milton Palacios (footballer, born 1988), Honduran football defender